Sol Babitz (October 11, 1911 – 1982) was an American violinist, musicologist, teacher, writer, and pioneer of historically informed performance. He married artist Mae Babitz in 1942 and had two daughters, artist and writer Eve Babitz born in 1943 and designer Mirandi Babitz born in 1946. He lived in Hollywood across the street from the family of acting coach Jeff and Hope Corey. His family home was a musical and artistic salon with musicians Bernard Herrmann, Ingolf Dahl, Harry Lubin, Igor Stravinsky and poets Kenneth Rexroth, Kenneth Pagent, and Peter Yates and artists Eugene Berman and Vera Stravinsky. It was also where the Committee for Simon Rodia's Towers in Watts met to save the Watts Towers from being torn down.

Career

He was born in Brooklyn, New York. His education began in New York where at the age of sixteen he received the Carnegie Hall Gold Medal for violin. His later violin education included studies with Alexander Roman and Carl Flesch at the Berlin University of the Arts and with Marcel Chailley in Paris. Babitz was a violinist with the Los Angeles Philharmonic from 1933–37 under the conductor Otto Klemperer, and then played with the Twentieth Century Fox studio orchestra from 1946-60. His education was also formed by jamming with Stuff Smith and Jelly Roll Morton in the clubs on Central Avenue in the 1940s.

In the early 1950s he collaborated with the poet Peter Yates and the architect Rudolf Shindler to create a concert space on top of Yates's home where the concert series "Evenings on the Roof" introduced works by Béla Bartók, Charles Ives, Arnold Schoenberg, and Igor Stravinsky. He worked with Stravinsky as concertmaster of the Ojai Festivals in the 1950s, and collaborated with him on an arrangement of Circus Polka.
He played the violin part on a Columbia Broadcasting System's performance of l'Histoire du Soldat. He also created fingering for Schoenberg.

In 1965 he was a co-founder of the "Early Music Laboratory" (EML) in Los Angeles, investing considerable time in research into historical performance practice, especially the music of the 17th and 18th century. He also conducted research into historical instrumental techniques, e.g. for violin and harpsichord.  He received several research grants in the early 1960s from the Fulbright Foundation and the Ford Foundation to travel in Europe and study early music. He released an album and a pamphlet summarizing his views on the playing of Bach called "The Great Baroque Hoax." He died in Los Angeles in 1982.

Recordings
 Charles Ives: Sonata No. 2 for Violin and Piano, movements ii–iii (Sol Babitz [vn] and Ingolf Dahl [pf]; for Alco label, issued c1947)

References

External links
 Biography
 Brief biography (UCLA library)
 Brief Biography (Music And Dance In California And The West (1948) by Richard Drake Sauners)

Writing/Research
 Works (@ openlibrary.org)

American performers of early music
1911 births
1982 deaths
American male violinists
20th-century American violinists
20th-century American male musicians